Zora (Izora), or Cokoba (Cokobanci) in Hausa, is a Kainji language of Nigeria.

Demographics
According to Blench (2016), Zora (also called Chokobo) is spoken by 19 speakers, in some two hours drive from Jos. The speakers are all over 60 years and rarely talk to one another, since they are spread across 10 settlements. The morphology and phonology have been highly eroded as well.

References

Sources
Blench, Roger. Zora: a highly endangered East Kainji language of Northern Nigeria.

Languages of Nigeria
Endangered Niger–Congo languages
East Kainji languages